Giuditta is an operatic  (German for musical comedy) in five scenes, with music by Franz Lehár and a German libretto, by  and Fritz Löhner-Beda. Scored for a large orchestra, it was Lehár's last and most ambitious work, written on a larger scale than his previous operettas. Of all his works it is the one which most approaches true opera, the resemblances between the story and that of Bizet's Carmen and its unhappy ending heightening the resonances. Perhaps the best known song in the work is the soprano aria "", sung by Giuditta in the fourth scene. Another strong influence, especially for the North African setting, was the 1930 movie Morocco, starring Marlene Dietrich and Gary Cooper in very similar central roles, she being a singer-dancer, he being a soldier.

Production history
The work received its first performance at the Vienna State Opera on 20 January 1934, with Jarmila Novotná and Richard Tauber in the leading roles. The premiere attracted more attention than any of his previous works. It was broadcast live on 120 radio stations across Europe and the United States and ran for 42 performances in its debut season. Despite this initial interest, Giuditta soon faded from the repertoire.

The original production, directed by Hubert Marischka, played 42 times during the season in which it was introduced into the general Vienna opera repertoire. In 1938, after only a few more performances had been played, came the Anschluss and Tauber left town, as did Novotná. Librettist Fritz Löhner-Beda was taken away to a concentration camp and was murdered in Auschwitz.

Giuditta received little attention overseas. It was produced in Budapest shortly after its introduction in Vienna, and the Théâtre de la Monnaie, Brussels, staged a production (translated by André Mauprey) the following season with Kate Walter-Lippert and José Janson in the leading roles. Janson also featured in the first French performance, at Toulouse in 1936, opposite Mme Chauny-Lasson, but Giuditta, in spite of a handful of provincial productions, did not play in Paris, nor London, nor New York. However, the work got a late English-language and American première at the Ohio Light Opera in 1994. It was subsequently also recorded in English by conductor Richard Bonynge, featuring tenor Jerry Hadley.

In 1970 a German television version was made with tenor Rudolf Schock and soprano Teresa Stratas.

Roles

Synopsis
The alluring Giuditta abandons her husband Manuele, and runs off with Octavio, an army officer, to North Africa. Military obligations intervene, and Octavio leaves Giuditta behind. She becomes a night club dancer, only to be discovered by Octavio, after he eventually deserts his unit. Giuditta is a success in her new profession, but Octavio's self-esteem is destroyed, and he becomes a club pianist.

Recordings
 Decca GOS 583-4: Hilde Güden; Waldemar Kmentt; Murray Dickie; Emmy Loose; Walter Berry; Oscar Czerwenka; Vienna State Opera Chorus and Orchestra; Rudolf Moralt, conductor
 EMI Classics ZDMB-65378: Edda Moser; Nicolai Gedda; Brigitte Lindner; Martin Finke; Günter Wewel; Willi Boskovsky; Munich Radio Symphony And Chorus. Digitally recorded in May 1980.
Original cast recordings of six numbers were made in Vienna by Odeon on 11 January 1934, with the composer conducting the Vienna Philharmonic. These include four solos by Tauber, one by Novotná, and their duet "".

References

Further reading
Lamb, Andrew, "Giuditta", The New Grove Dictionary of Opera, ed. Stanley Sadie (London, 1992)

External links

Giuditta, extensive synopsis, performance details
"Meine Lippen, sie küssen so heiß", Danielle de Niese, TED July 2011
 with Teresa Stratas, Rudolf Schock

Operas by Franz Lehár
Operas
German-language operas
1934 operas